Tossavainen is a Finnish surname. Notable people with the surname include:

 Antti Tossavainen (1886–1962), Finnish salesperson and politician
 Ilmari Tossavainen (1887–1978), Finnish politician
 Reijo Tossavainen (born 1948), Finnish politician

Finnish-language surnames